Bernard Guyot (19 November 1945 – 28 February 2021) was a French road cyclist. His sporting career began with U.S. Creteil.  As an amateur he competed in the individual road race at the 1964 Summer Olympics, won the Peace Race in 1966, and placed fourth in the team time trial at the 1966 UCI Road World Championships. In 1967 he turned professional and won 10 races before retiring in 1974. He raced the Tour de France in 1968-1972, placing 27th in 1968 and 28th in 1971. In the national professional road championship, Guyot placed second in 1972 and third in 1969. His father Bernard Sr. and brothers Claude and Serge were also competitive cyclists.

Guyot died on 1 March 2021, aged 75.

Major results

1964
 1st Overall Tour de Namur
1st Stage 3
 1st Stage 14 Tour du Maroc
1965
 2nd Overall Flèche du Sud
 10th Overall Tour de l'Avenir
1st Stages 7 & 13 (ITT)
1966
 1st  Overall Peace Race
1st Stage 3a
 4th Overall Tour de l'Avenir
1st Stage 7 (ITT)
1967
 1st  Overall 
1st Stage 1
 1st Tour de l'Herault
 2nd Overall Paris–Nice
1st Stage 8 (ITT)
 2nd Trofeo Baracchi (with Jacques Anquetil)
 2nd Coppa Agostoni
 2nd GP Lugano (ITT)
 3rd Overall Four Days of Dunkirk
1st Stage 2b (ITT)
 3rd Overall Paris–Luxembourg
 4th Overall Grand Prix du Midi Libre
 4th Critérium National de la Route
 5th Overall Euskal Bizikleta
1st Stage 4
 5th Paris–Tours
 7th Overall Tour de l'Oise
 8th Overall Volta a Catalunya
1st Stage 5a
 8th GP Monaco
 10th Giro di Lombardia
1968
 1st Circuit d'Auvergne
 2nd Grand Prix de Fayt-le-Franc
 3rd Maël–Pestivien
 4th Overall Paris–Nice
 8th Liège–Bastogne–Liège
1969
 1st Boucles de la Seine
 3rd Road race, National Road Championships
 3rd Overall Tour de l'Oise
 4th Baden–Baden
 9th GP Monaco
 10th Critérium National de la Route
1970
 8th Boucles de la Seine
 9th Bordeaux–Paris
1972
 2nd Road race, National Road Championships

References

External links
 

People from Savigny-sur-Orge
1945 births
2021 deaths
French male cyclists
Olympic cyclists of France
Cyclists at the 1964 Summer Olympics
Sportspeople from Essonne
Cyclists from Île-de-France
20th-century French people